Saia Fainga'a (born 2 February 1987) is an Australian professional rugby union footballer.

Family and early life
Saia Fainga'a was born in Queanbeyan, New South Wales, and started playing rugby union at the age of 11 or 12 at the Queanbeyan club. He was a member of the Brumbies Academy from the age of 14 and attended St Edmund's College, Canberra, where he was selected for the Australian Schools team in 2003 and 2004.

Saia's twin brother Anthony, and younger brothers Vili and Colby are also professional rugby union players. The Fainga'a's are of Tongan English and Italian descent.

Career

Fainga'a made his Super 14 debut in 2006. He was fast-tracked into the Brumbies' side due to injuries in the squad, and played his first senior match for the Brumbies against the Stormers in Cape Town. Later that year he captained the Australian Under 19s team to win the IRB World Championship in Dubai. Fainga'a went on to earn 27 super rugby caps at the Brumbies from 2006 to 2008.
In 2008, Saia and his twin brother Anthony signed on to play with the Queensland Reds for the 2009 season. He made his Test debut for Australia in 2010 against Fiji in Canberra.
He played in all 18 matches of the Reds 2011 Super Rugby title-winning season, and was selected alongside his brother Anthony in the Wallabies squad for the 2011 Rugby World Cup in New Zealand, where Australia took third place.

On 2 June 2017 it was announced he would move to England after signing for newly promoted Premiership side London Irish. He was released ahead of the 2020–21 season.

Reference list

External links
Wallabies Profile
Reds Profile

1987 births
Australian rugby union players
Indigenous Australian rugby union players
Australian sportspeople of Tongan descent
Australia international rugby union players
ACT Brumbies players
Queensland Reds players
Rugby union hookers
Twin sportspeople
People from Queanbeyan
Living people
Queensland Country (NRC team) players
London Irish players
Rugby union players from New South Wales